The 1986 Nice International Open was a men's tennis tournament played on outdoor clay courts at the Nice Lawn Tennis Club in Nice, France, and was part of the 1986 Nabisco Grand Prix. It was the 15th edition of the tournament and was held from 14 April through 20 April 1986. Unseeded Emilio Sánchez won the singles title.

Finals

Singles

 Emilio Sánchez defeated  Paul McNamee 6–1, 6–3
 It was Sánchez' first singles title of his career.

Doubles

 Jakob Hlasek /  Pavel Složil defeated  Gary Donnelly /  Colin Dowdeswell 6–3, 3–6, 11–9

References

External links
 ITF tournament edition details

Nice International Open
1986
Nice International Open
Nice International Open
20th century in Nice